The 2000 Humanitarian Bowl was the 4th edition of the bowl game. It featured the Boise State Broncos, and the UTEP Miners.

Background
In their final season in the Big West Conference, the Broncos went 5–0 in conference play, being the final champion of the Big West Conference. It was their 2nd conference title since joining Division I-A in 1996. As for the Miners, they had finished as co-champion of the Western Athletic Conference (which occurred after a loss to #15 TCU), their first conference title since 1956. This was UTEP's first bowl since 1988 and Boise State's 2nd straight Humanitarian Bowl.

Game summary
Boise State scored first on a 28-yard touchdown pass from quarterback Bart Hendricks to Jay Swillie giving the Broncos a 7–0 lead. In the second quarter, Nick Calaycay kicked a 41-yard field goal to give the Broncos a 10–0 lead. UTEP got on the board following a 9-yard connection from Rocky Perez to Joey Knapp making it 10–7. A 28-yard field goal from Ricky Bishop tied the contest at 10. With only 23 seconds left in the half, Bart Hendricks rushed 12 yards for a touchdown, giving Boise State a 17–10 lead at intermission.

In the third quarter, Bart Hendricks scored on a 77-yard touchdown run, increasing Boise State's lead to 24–10. Ricky Bishop of UTEP made a 43-yard field goal to make it 24–13.

In the fourth quarter, Brock Forsey scored on a 43-yard touchdown run, making the lead 31–13. UTEP would attempt to come back on a 47-yard field goal from Ricky Bishop, and a 3-yard Chris Porter touchdown run to make it 31–23. Hendricks scored on an 11-yard pass from Banks to make the final score 38–23. The victory was the second consecutive Humanitarian Bowl victory for Boise State.

Scoring Summary

Statistics

References

External links
http://www.usatoday.com/sports/scores100/100363/100363385.htm

Humanitarian Bowl
Famous Idaho Potato Bowl
Boise State Broncos football bowl games
UTEP Miners football bowl games
December 2000 sports events in the United States
2000 in sports in Idaho